Mac the Moose is a steel and concrete sculpture of a moose in Moose Jaw, Saskatchewan. It is on the grounds of Moose Jaw's visitors' center, on the corner of E Thatcher Drive and the Trans-Canada Highway.

History
Mac the Moose was built in 1984 by Saskatoon artist Don Foulds with the goal of attracting visitors to the city. The construction process involved a steel frame covered with metal mesh and four coats of cement. A contest was held to name the moose, with the name "Mac" being chosen after Les MacKenzie. The giant moose was one of the city's first tourist attractions. The project was completed in May 1984.

In 2004, Mac was moved  using a flatbed truck and is now just off of the Trans-Canada highway next to the Moose Jaw visitors' center. Although Mac has been vandalized many times (once being painted blue and other physical damage was done, including losing his jaw), he still stands, although surrounded by a fence in 2009. In 2013, Mac was honoured by the Moose Jaw Times Herald as Moose Jaw's Best Celebrity.

Rivalry

After 31 years of holding the title of the world's largest moose, in 2015 Mac the Moose was surpassed by another moose statue in Stor-Elvdal, Norway, called The Big Elk (moose (Alces alces) are often called elk in Europe). The Big Elk stood about  taller. In an interview with Global News on the subject, Moose Jaw's mayor Deb Higgins wasn't bothered, stating that "I think we’ve won the battle, first and foremost that Mac's reputation has spread to Norway and beyond." Subsequently, Mac the Moose was billed as North America's largest moose, with Tourism Moose Jaw referring to it as the "World's Second Largest Moose".

In January 2019, two Canadian comedians urged Moose Jaw residents to add  to Macs height (likely by extending his antlers or giving him a helmet), so that the moose statue would once again win the title of the world's largest moose. The Norwegians responded and have stated that they will not give up the world record without a fight. News outlets from all over the globe have mentioned the contest.

The Canadians do have one edge over Norway—their moose was built by Canadians in the country where it resides, making it essentially a 'native' moose; the Norway statue instead, while being conceived by Norwegian artist Linda Bakke, was erected in China and imported largely as a cost-saving measure.

References

External links
https://web.archive.org/web/20090228185615/http://www.saskschools.ca/~gregory/sask/mac.html
http://www.roadsideattractions.ca/mjmoose.htm
https://web.archive.org/web/20081121141539/http://tourism.sasktelwebhosting.com/mac.php
https://www.dagbladet.no/nyheter/prisen-pa-ny-20-meter-hoy-elg-i-gull-er-klar/70686330

Buildings and structures in Moose Jaw
Roadside attractions in Canada
1984 sculptures
Concrete sculptures in Canada
Animal sculptures in Canada
Vandalized works of art in Canada
Deer in art